The Bird Fiord Formation is a geologic formation in Nunavut. It preserves fossils dating back to the Devonian period.

Fossil content

See also

 List of fossiliferous stratigraphic units in Nunavut

References

 

Devonian Nunavut
Devonian southern paleotropical deposits